Matteo Fedele (born 20 July 1992) is a Swiss professional footballer who plays as a central midfielder for Maltese club Ħamrun Spartans F.C.

Club career
Fedele is a youth exponent from FC Sion. He made his Swiss Super League debut at 16 May 2013 against Grasshopper Club Zürich. He played the first 74 minutes of a 0–4 home loss.

Honours
Universitatea Craiova
Cupa României: 2020–21
Supercupa României: 2021

References

External links
 
 

1992 births
Living people
Swiss people of Italian descent
Sportspeople from Lausanne
Swiss men's footballers
Switzerland under-21 international footballers
Association football midfielders
Swiss Super League players
Serie A players
Serie B players
Liga I players
Ligue 2 players
Maltese Premier League players
FC Sion players
Grasshopper Club Zürich players
A.C. Carpi players
S.S.C. Bari players
Calcio Foggia 1920 players
A.C. Cesena players
CS Universitatea Craiova players
Valenciennes FC players
Ħamrun Spartans F.C. players
Swiss expatriate footballers
Swiss expatriate sportspeople in Italy
Expatriate footballers in Italy
Swiss expatriate sportspeople in France
Expatriate footballers in France
Swiss expatriate sportspeople in Romania
Expatriate footballers in Romania
Swiss expatriate sportspeople in Malta
Expatriate footballers in Malta
Birkirkara F.C. players